The Ažytė is a river of Raseiniai district municipality and Kėdainiai district municipality, central Lithuania. It is a right tributary of the Šušvė river. It flows for 20 kilometres and has a basin area of 98 km². It originates near Betygala town and flows mostly eastwards. It meets Šušvė near Antkalnis village. 

The river valley is 10  depth. The river channel is canalized in the upper course. Its width is 6–7 meters, depth 0.5–0.6 meters. Rapidness of the flow is 0.1 meters per second.

The Ažytė runs through Barsukinė, Lenčiai, Ažytėnai, Antkalnis villages.

Its name possibly comes from the Lithuanian word ežia ('a boundary').

References

Rivers of Lithuania
Kėdainiai District Municipality
Raseiniai District Municipality